Phycoerythrobilin synthase (PebS) is an enzyme with systematic name (3Z)-phycoerythrobilin:ferredoxin oxidoreductase (from biliverdin IX alpha). This enzyme catalyses the following chemical reaction

 (3Z)-phycoerythrobilin + 2 oxidized ferredoxin  biliverdin IX alpha + 2 reduced ferredoxin

This enzyme, from a cyanophage infecting oceanic cyanobacteria of the Prochlorococcus genus.

References

External links 
 

EC 1.3.7